is a Japanese track and field athlete who specialized in the 400 metres. She was selected to be a part of the 2007 World Championships as a reserve but did not compete.

Personal bests

International competition

References

External links

Natsumi Watanabe at JAAF 

1988 births
Living people
Japanese female sprinters
Sportspeople from Niigata Prefecture
World Athletics Championships athletes for Japan